The Environmental Protection Authority of Western Australia (EPA) is a statutory authority within the Government of Western Australia, established on 1 January 1972, which acts as the primary provider of independent environmental advice to the government. Since 27 November 2009 it has been supported administratively by the Office of the Environmental Protection Authority (OEPA), which was amalgamated with the Department of Environment Regulation and the Department of Water to form  the Department of Water and Environmental Regulation on 1 July 2017. It  operates under the Environmental Protection Act 1986.

The EPA provides advice to the Minister for Environment through various reports, as well as releasing statements to the public detailing significant environmental matters.  Its role also includes formulation of environmental protection policies.

History

On 27 November 2009 the Western Australian Government formed a dedicated department to support the EPA, known as the Office of the Environmental Protection Authority (OEPA), in order to provide the Authority with greater independence and control of its policies and processes.

On 1 July 2017, OEPA was amalgamated with the Department of Environment Regulation and the Department of Water to form the Department of Water and Environmental Regulation.

Description
The Authority consists of five members: a full-time chair, a part-time deputy chair, and three other part-time members. Members of the EPA board are not public servants. They are appointed by the Governor of Western Australia on the recommendation of the Minister for Environment.  Unusually for a government authority, under the Environmental Protection Act 1986, neither the Authority nor its chairman are subject to the direction of the Minister.

The OEPA provides support services such as negotiating with stakeholders and proponents, technical advice regarding the formulation of policies, research and formulation of reports, and monitoring of project implementation.

The Authority operates and has statutory powers under the Environmental Protection Act 1986 and as amended by the Environmental Protection Amendment Bill 2002.  These are, as defined in Section 16 of the 2002 Amendment Bill:
 to conduct environmental impact assessments;
 to consider and initiate the means of protecting the environment and the means of preventing, controlling and abating pollution and environmental harm;
 to encourage and carry out studies, investigations and research into the problems of environmental protection and the prevention, control and abatement of pollution and environmental harm;
 to obtain the advice of persons having special knowledge, experience or  responsibility in regard to environmental protection and the prevention, control and abatement of pollution and environmental harm;
 to advise the Minister on environmental matters generally and on any matter that he/she may refer to it for advice, including the environmental protection aspects of any proposal or scheme, and on the evaluation of information relating thereto;
 to prepare, and seek approval for, environmental protection policies;
 to promote environmental awareness within the community and to encourage understanding by the community of the environment;
 to receive representations on environmental matters from members of the public;
 to provide advice on environmental matters to members of the public;
 to publish reports on environmental matters generally;
 to publish for the benefit of planners, builders, engineers or other persons guidelines to assist them in undertaking their activities in such a manner as to minimise the effect on the environment of those activities or the results thereof;
 to keep under review the progress made in the attainment of the objects and purpose of this Act;
 to coordinate all such activities, whether governmental or otherwise, as are necessary to protect, restore or improve the environment in the State;
 to establish and develop criteria for the assessment of the extent of environmental change, pollution and environmental harm;
 to specify standards and criteria, and the methods of sampling and testing to be used for any purpose;
 to promote, encourage, coordinate or carry out planning and projects in environmental management; and
 generally, to perform such other functions as are prescribed.

See also 

 Waste management in Australia

References

External links

Nature conservation in Western Australia
Environmental agencies of country subdivisions
Statutory agencies of Western Australia
Environmental agencies in Australia